Bosque is a scientific journal published by the Forestry Faculty of the Southern University of Chile. It publishes articles on a wide range of forestry-related topics, primarily on issues that are relevant to Chile, Latin America and the Southern Hemisphere. The published articles include peer-reviewed scientific research papers, items of current interest and opinion pieces. Bosque's first issue was published in 1975 and the journal was issued yearly until 1985. From 1985 to 2003 it was issued twice a year and from 2003 on three times a year. The topics covered in Bosque are management and production of forestry resources, wood science and technology, silviculture, forest ecology, natural resources conservation, and rural development associated with forest ecosystems. The journal publishes research articles, notes and opinions, both in Spanish and English. Bosque was included in the Science Citation Index Expanded in 2009. The journal is also indexed in The Zoological Record.

See also 
 List of forestry journals

References

External links 
 

Forestry journals
Forestry in Chile
Austral University of Chile academic journals
Publications established in 1975
Multilingual journals
1975 establishments in Chile